The Battle of Port Gibson was fought near Port Gibson, Mississippi, on May 1, 1863, between Union and Confederate forces during the Vicksburg Campaign of the American Civil War. The Union Army was led by Maj. Gen. Ulysses S. Grant, and was victorious.

Background
Grant launched his campaign against Vicksburg, Mississippi, in the spring of 1863, starting his army south from Milliken's Bend on the west side of the Mississippi River. He intended to storm Grand Gulf, while his subordinate Maj. Gen. William T. Sherman and the XV Corps deceived the main army in Vicksburg by feigning an assault on the Yazoo Bluffs. Grant would then detach Maj. Gen. John A. McClernand's XIII Corps to Maj. Gen. Nathaniel P. Banks at Port Hudson, Louisiana, while Sherman hurried to join Grant and James B. McPherson and the XVII Corps for an inland move against the railroad. The Union fleet, however, failed to silence the Confederate batteries at Grand Gulf. Grant then sailed farther south and began crossing at Bruinsburg, Mississippi, on April 30. Sherman's feint against the Yazoo Bluffs—the Battle of Snyder's Bluff—was a complete success, and only a single Confederate brigade was detached south.

The only Confederate cavalry in the area, Wirt Adams's regiment, had been ordered away to pursue Grierson's raiders, and Maj. Gen. John S. Bowen performed a reconnaissance in force to determine Grant's intentions. Bowen moved south from Grand Gulf with Brig. Gen. Martin E. Green's Brigade and took up a position astride the Rodney road just southwest of Port Gibson near Magnolia Church. A single brigade of reinforcements from Vicksburg under Brig. Gen. Edward D. Tracy arrived later and was posted across the Bruinsburg Road two miles north of Green's position. Brig. Gen. William E. Baldwin's Brigade arrived later and was positioned in support of Green's Brigade. One-hundred-foot-tall hills separated by nearly vertical ravines choked with canebrakes and underbrush rendered Bowen's position tenable, despite the overwhelming Union force heading his way.

The absence of any Confederate cavalry would have a major impact on the campaign. If Bowen had known that Grant's men were landing at Bruinsburg and not Rodney, he would have taken a position on the bluffs above Bruinsburg, denying Grant's army a bridgehead into the area. Federal efforts to push rapidly inland were slowed because McClernand had forgotten to issue rations to the men. Despite the resulting delay, however, the Army of the Tennessee moved onto the river bluffs unopposed and pushed rapidly towards Port Gibson. Shortly after midnight on May 1, advanced elements of the 14th Division under Brig. Gen. Eugene A. Carr engaged Confederate pickets near the Shaifer House. Sporadic skirmishing and artillery fire continued until 3 a.m. Wary of Tracy's Brigade to the north, McClernand posted Brig. Gen. Peter J. Osterhaus's 9th Division facing that direction. Having developed each other's positions, the opposing forces sat down and waited for daylight.

Battle

General Carr scouted the ground before him and realized that a frontal assault through the canebrakes would be fruitless. He devised a turning movement in which one brigade would move slowly forward through the canebrake, while the second brigade would descend into the Widow's Creek bottoms and strike for the Confederates' left flank. Brig. Gen. Alvin P. Hovey's 12th Division arrived and surged forward just as Carr's men were storming the Confederate position. Both flanks were turned, and Green's men broke and ran. McClernand stopped to reorganize, then launched into a series of grandiose speeches until Grant pointed out that the Confederates had simply withdrawn to a more defendable position. Reinforced by Brig. Gen. A. J. Smith's 10th Division and Stevenson's Brigade of McPherson's XVII Corps, McClernand resumed the pursuit. With 20,000 men crowded into a  front, McClernand's plan appeared to be to force his way past the Confederate line. A flanking assault by Col. Francis Cockrell's Missouri brigade crumpled the Federal right flank and gave McClernand pause. Sundown found the two sides settling into a stalemate along a broad front on the Rodney Road several miles from Port Gibson.

On the Bruinsburg Road front, Osterhaus had been content to pressure Tracy's command with Federal sharpshooters and artillery, occasionally launching an unsupported regiment against the Confederate line. Maj. Gen. James B. McPherson showed up late in the afternoon with Brig. Gen. John Eugene Smith's brigade. Donning a cloak to disguise his rank, he reviewed the front lines and quickly devised a turning movement that would render untenable the entire Confederate right flank. Twenty minutes after the troops had been staged for the assault, the Confederates were retreating into the Bayou Pierre bottoms, having left behind several hundred prisoners. The road to his rear now threatened, Bowen commenced retreating through Port Gibson to the north shore of Bayou Pierre.

Aftermath
On May 2, Grant quickly maneuvered Bowen out of position by sending McPherson to cross the Bayou Pierre at a ford several miles upstream. Struck with the realization that McPherson could cut him off from the bridge over the Big Black River, Bowen ordered the formidable defenses at Grand Gulf abandoned, the magazine exploded, and the heavy artillery destroyed. Union gunboats, investigating the nature of the explosion, arrived and took Grand Gulf without a shot. Grant understood the nature of the explosion and rode to Grand Gulf with a small escort, enjoying his first bath in weeks, and celebrating the capture of what would become his central supply depot as he moved inland. As he relaxed, he caught up on correspondence, including a message from Banks that he was nowhere near Port Hudson. Grant's plan to detach McClernand to Banks would have to wait.

Too late to do anything more than affirm Bowen's decision, Maj. Gen. William W. Loring arrived and took command of the Confederates. Heavy rear-guard activity took place as the Confederates scrambled to remove their force across the narrow bridge. Advanced elements of the XVII Corps arrived in time to save the bridge from destruction. The ragtag army that had fought so well at Port Gibson would not rest until they had entered the Warrenton fortifications nearly ten miles away. Here they began improving the fortifications along the roads to Vicksburg, expecting that Grant would be close behind. Grant, however, would have other plans; the roads on the west bank of the Big Black River were open all the way to the Mississippi state capital and the critical rail link to Vicksburg. Against this target, Grant poised his army to strike.

Battlefield preservation
Although most of the Port Gibson battlefield is still privately owned, the Civil War Trust (a division of the American Battlefield Trust) and its partners have acquired and preserved  of the Port Gibson battlefield.

See also
 Battles of the American Civil War
 Bibliography of Ulysses S. Grant
 Bibliography of the American Civil War

References

External links
History Under Siege: Port Gibson designated by the Civil War Preservation Trust as a Top 10 most endangered Civil War battlefield in 2009
National Park Service battle description
CWSAC Report Update
Port Gibson

Port Gibson
Port Gibson
Port Gibson
Port Gibson
Claiborne County, Mississippi
Port Gibson
1863 in Mississippi
May 1863 events
Port Gibson
Port Gibson, Mississippi